Harold Dalsan is a Saint Lucian politician who represents the constituency of Soufrière for the Saint Lucia Labour Party. Dalsan won the seat at the general election held on 11 December 2006. Dalsan became Minister for Social Transformation and Local Government in 2011.

References

See also
Politics of Saint Lucia

Living people
Government ministers of Saint Lucia
Members of the House of Assembly of Saint Lucia
Year of birth missing (living people)
Saint Lucia Labour Party politicians